Princess Yuan of Lu, also called Princess Luyuan (late 3rd-century BC – May 187 BC), was a princess of the Han Dynasty. She was the eldest daughter of the dynasty's founder Emperor Gaozu and Empress Lü Zhi. She had one daughter who was married to her younger brother, Emperor Hui.

Biography
Princess Yuan's exact birth date is unknown, but her appearance in official records suggests that she was born before 211 BCE. She was born before her father Liu Bang became a serious political contender, after which most of her early life was spent avoiding capture by enemy forces.

In 204 BCE, during the Chu–Han Contention, the carriage of Princess Yuan and her brother Liu Ying was pursued by forces of the Chu State. Duke Teng, a member of the Xiahou family, ordered the two to leave the carriage and replaced them with two decoy travellers to allow them to escape.

Liu Bang was proclaimed Emperor Gaozu of the Han Dynasty in 202 BCE. Princess Yuan's mother Empress Lü Zhi had little power after her husband became emperor and was powerless to prevent Emperor Gaozu from making plans to marry Princess Yuan, as the daughter of the legitimate wife, to a Xiongnu leader to prevent the nomads from causing trouble on the northern border. She was married later, however, to Zhang Ao of Zhao, who succeeded his father as ruler in 204 BCE. The exact date of their marriage is unknown. Their daughter Zhang Yan was married to Princess Yuan's younger brother Liu Ying in  November 192 BCE, as part of their mother's attempts to control the imperial household.

In December 194 BCE, King Daohui of Qi presented Chengyang Commandery to Princess Yuan and honoured her as Queen dowager.

Burial
Princess Yuan is buried in the Han Royal Tomb group near Xianyang at Anling, alongside her brother, daughter and husband. Her tomb is larger than that of her husband.

Medias 

 She's one of the character of the 2010 Chinese TV series Beauty's Rival in Palace. She is portrayed by Lu Jia Rong.

References

Notes

Cited works

187 BC deaths
Han dynasty imperial princesses
Year of birth unknown
Emperor Gaozu of Han
3rd-century BC Chinese women
3rd-century BC Chinese people
2nd-century BC Chinese women
2nd-century BC Chinese people
Daughters of emperors